Andrew Kirkaldy (18 March 1860 – 16 April 1934) was a Scottish professional golfer who played during the late 19th and early 20th centuries. He was a frequent competitor in the Open Championship, finishing in the top-10 on 14 occasions. His best finish came in 1889 when he was second. He tied for first place in the event but lost a playoff to Willie Park Jr.

Early life
Kirkaldy was born 18 March 1860 in Scotland.  He was married to Annie McLeod.

Golf career
In his first Open Championship in 1879, Kirkaldy finished second to Jamie Anderson at the Old Course at St Andrews. In the 1889 Open Championship at Musselburgh Links, he lost a playoff to Willie Park, Jnr. In the 1891 Open Championship his brother Hugh beat him by two shots and he finished second alongside Willie Fernie. In all, he placed in the top-10 14 times and the top-3 six times at the Open.

Death
He died on 16 April 1934 and is buried in the Eastern Cemetery in St Andrews, south of the cathedral, near the main south-west entrance. His wife Annie McLeod Kirkaldy lies with him.

Results in major championships

Note: Kirkaldy played only in The Open Championship.

DNP = Did not play
WD = Withdrew
CUT = missed the half-way cut
"T" indicates a tie for a place
Yellow background for top-10

Team appearances
England–Scotland Professional Match (representing Scotland): 1904 (tie), 1905 (tie), 1907, 1909, 1910

References

Scottish male golfers
1860 births
1934 deaths